Thekla (early 820s or 830s – after 870), latinized as Thecla, was a princess of the Amorian dynasty of the Byzantine Empire. The daughter and eldest child of Byzantine emperor Theophilos and empress Theodora, she was proclaimed  in the late 830s. After Theophilos's death in 842 and her mother becoming regent for Thekla's younger brother Michael III, Thekla was associated with the regime as co-empress alongside Theodora and Michael.

Thekla was deposed by Michael III, possibly alongside her mother, in 856 and consigned to a convent in Constantinople. Some time later, she allegedly returned to imperial affairs and became the mistress of Michael III's friend and co-emperor Basil I. After Basil murdered Michael in 867 and took power as the sole emperor, Thekla was neglected as his mistress and she took another lover, John Neatokometes. Once Basil found out about the affair, Thekla fell out of favor, was beaten and had her property confiscated.

Life 
Thekla was born on an uncertain date, as calculating her date of birth depends on the year her parents married, estimated to be either  820/821, or 830. Thus she was born in either the early 820s or the early 830s. The historian Warren Treadgold gives her a birth date of  831, and the historian Juan Signes Codoñer of spring 822. She is presented by contemporary sources as the eldest child of Byzantine emperor Theophilos and empress Theodora; but, some historians, such as John Bagnell Bury and Ernest Walter Brooks, have argued that her sister Maria was the eldest on the basis that she is the only one of the daughters to have been engaged, and generally the eldest married first. She was named after Theophilos's mother, Thekla. Thekla had six siblings: the four sisters Anna, Anastasia, Pulcheria, and Maria, whom Theophilos took great pride in, and the two brothers Constantine and Michael. Constantine, who shortly after birth had been proclaimed co-emperor by their father, drowned in a palace cistern as an infant.

In the 830s, the eldest sisters Thekla, Anna, and Anastasia were all proclaimed , an honorific title sometimes granted to women of the imperial family. This event was commemorated through the issue of an unusual set of coins that depicted Theophilos, Theodora, and Thekla on one side and Anna and Anastasia on the other. Although Theophilos was a staunch iconoclast, and thus opposed the veneration of icons, Thekla was taught to venerate them in secret by her mother and Theophilos's step-mother Euphrosyne. Theophilos built a palace for Thekla and her sisters at ta Karianou. Shortly before his death, Theophilos worked to betroth Thekla to Louis II, the heir to the Carolingian Empire, to unite the two empires against the threat they faced from continued Arab invasions. Such a match would also have been advantageous for Louis II's father Lothair I, who was engaged in a civil war against his brothers. Because of Lothair's defeat at the Battle of Fontenoy in 841 and Theophilos's death in 842, the marriage never happened.

After Theophilos's death on 20 January 842, Empress Theodora became regent for Thekla's young brother, the three-year-old Michael III. In practical terms, Theodora ruled in her own right and is often recognized as an empress regnant by modern scholars, although the eunuch Theoktistos held much power. Coins issued in the first year of Theodora's reign depict Theodora alone on the obverse and Michael III together with Thekla on the reverse. The only one of the three given a title is Theodora (as Theodora , "the Lady Theodora"). Thekla was associated with imperial power as co-empress alongside Theodora and Michael; this reality is indicated by her depiction in coins, where she is shown as larger than Michael. An imperial seal, also from Theodora's early reign, titles not only Michael but also Theodora and Thekla as "Emperors of the Romans". This may suggest that Theodora viewed her daughter, just as she did her son, as a potential future heir. The numismatist Philip Grierson comments that dated documents from the time of the coins' minting prove that she was "formally associated with Theodora and Michael in the government of the Empire." However, the historian George Ostrogorsky states that Thekla does not appear to have been interested in government affairs. Thekla fell heavily ill in 843, and is said to have been cured later by visiting the Theotokos monastery in Constantinople; for curing Thekla, Theodora issued a chrysobull to the monastery.

On 15 March 856, Theodora's reign officially ended with Michael III being proclaimed sole emperor. In 857 or 858 Theodora was expelled from the imperial palace and confined to a convent in Gastria, in Constantinople; the monastery had been converted from a house by her maternal grandmother, Theoktiste, likely during the reign of Theophilos. Thekla and the other sisters were either expelled and placed in the same convent at the same time, or had already been there for some time. Whether they were ordained as nuns is uncertain: they may have actually been ordained, or it may only have been intended. In one version of the narrative, they were confined to the palace at ta Karianou in November 858, possibly in a semi-monastical setting. Another version claims they were immediately placed in the Monastery of Gastria. The most common narrative states that Theodora was confined to the monastery with Pulcheria, while Thekla, and her other sisters Anna and Anastasia, were first kept at the palace at ta Karianou, but shortly thereafter moved to the Monastery of Gastria and shorn as nuns. Theodora may have been released from the convent around 863. According to the tradition of Symeon Logothete, a 10th-century Byzantine historian, Thekla was also released and used by Michael III to attempt to make a political deal. He states that in around 865, Michael had married his long-time lover Eudokia Ingerina to his friend and co-emperor Basil I, in order to mask the continued relationship of Michael and Eudokia. Some historians, such as Cyril Mango, believe that Michael did so after impregnating Eudokia, to ensure that the child would be born legitimate. However, Symeon's neutrality is disputed, and other contemporary sources do not speak of this conspiracy, leading several prominent Byzantists, such as Ostrogorsky and Nicholas Adontz to dismiss this narrative.

According to Symeon, Michael also offered Thekla to Basil as a mistress, perhaps to keep his attention away from Eudokia, a plan which Thekla had allegedly consented to. Thus Thekla, who Treadgold states was 35 at the time, became Basil's mistress in early 866, according to Symeon's narrative. The historian William Greenwalt speculates on the reasons that drove Thekla to agree to this relationship: resentment for having been unmarried for so long, Basil's imposing physical stature, or political gain. After Basil murdered Michael III in 867 and seized power for himself, Symeon further writes that Thekla then became neglected and took another lover, John Neatokometes, sometime after 870. When Basil found out about the affair, he had John beaten and consigned to a monastery. Thekla was also beaten and her considerable riches were confiscated. Mango, who supports the theory of the alleged affairs, commented that Basil would already have had good reason to dislike Neatokometes, as the man had attempted to warn Michael of his impending murder, but believes the best explanation for Basil's response is that "Thekla had previously occupied some place in his life", as a mistress. The , a 10th-century Byzantine book on courtly protocol and history, states that she was buried in the Monastery of Gastria, where she had been confined earlier, in a sarcophagus with her mother and her sisters Anastasia and Pulcheria.

References

Notes

Citations

Bibliography 

 

 
 
 
 

 
 

 

9th-century births
9th-century deaths
Augustae
Daughters of Byzantine emperors
Daughters of emperors
9th-century Byzantine empresses
Burials at the Monastery of Gastria
Phrygian dynasty
Mistresses of Byzantine royalty
9th-century Byzantine nuns
9th-century women rulers
9th-century Byzantine women